Khosrow Haritash was an Iranian film director. He attended the USC School of Cinematic Arts in Los Angeles during the years 1965–66, and directed two films there, one of which was an adaptation of Samuel Beckett's Waiting for Godot.

Filmography
1976 Speeding naked till high noon 
1976 Malakout 
1976 The Custodian 
1971 Adamak

External links

 

Iranian film directors
Iranian screenwriters
1932 births
1980 deaths
20th-century screenwriters